Lauffen is in the district Gmunden within the central Salzkammergut in southern Upper Austria. It's a Katastralgemeinde of Bad Ischl. Its elevation is 490 m.

Cities and towns in Gmunden District